"Something for the Weekend" is a song by the Divine Comedy, produced by Darren Allison and Neil Hannon. It was the first single from Casanova and reached number 14 in the UK Singles Chart. The song subsequently became a hit when Chris Evans heard it at a friend's party and had it played on his radio show the following Monday.

The song itself is about a Lothario who is trying to seduce a woman, but she tricks him by asking him to investigate strange noises in the woodshed. Upon entering, he is knocked unconscious by her accomplices who then steal his car and money.

Release
The single release in the UK came two weeks before Super Furry Animals released their own song Something For The Weekend, from their album Fuzzy Logic as a single. The latter band changed their title to "Something 4 The Weekend".

Critical reception
In an AllMusic review, critic 
Matthew Greenwald declared "Something for the Weekend" as "easily one of [Neil] Hannon's most breezy recordings", noting the song's musical style "has a hit of R&B in the percussion" with "energetic drum and piano pattern." Fellow critic Ned Raggett reviewing Casanova, described the song "at once soaring, cheeky, leering, and truly weird."

References

External links
  Something For The Weekend - official video
  A compilation of press reviews for Casanova and Something For The Weekend at Darren Allison's official website.

1996 singles
The Divine Comedy (band) songs
1996 songs
Songs written by Neil Hannon
Setanta Records singles